Category F can refer to:

 Category F railway stations (DfT)
 Category F necrophilia, known as catathymic
 Category F attack aircraft (US)
 Category F, for a nuclear weapons security device
 Category F birds (Great Britain), includes species recorded before 1800 including fossil species
 Category F license, for credit reference agencies